Justice Ingram may refer to:

G. Conley Ingram, justice of the Supreme Court of Georgia
Kenneth F. Ingram, justice of the Alabama Supreme Court